Yanghu Wetland Park is a public wetland park in China, located at the western Changsha, Hunan. Located in the subdistrict of Yanghu, Yuelu District, Yanghu Wetland Park is bordered by Jin River on the South and east, South Xiaoxiang Avenue on the West, and Yanghu Avenue on the North.

History
The wetland is the core zone of Yanghuyuan or Yanghu Cofferdam that its ancient name was "Waguankou" (or "Waguan Estuary"). Historically it was part of Yanghu Township in 1951 and a part of Pingtang People's Commune of Wangcheng County in 1958. In 1962, it was the territory of Pingtang Commune of Pingtang District in Changsha County. it was the territory of Wangcheng County when the county was re-established from Changsha County in 1978 and that of Yuelu District when Pingtang Town was assigned to the jurisdiction of Yuelu District from Wangcheng County On June 15, 2008. 

Construction began in July 2010 and completed in 2014. 

On November 8, 2013, it has been categorized as a 4A-level tourist site by the China National Tourism Administration.

Geography
The wetland is located at the mouth of Jin River on the western bank of the Xiang River and the south of 2nd Ring Road in the southern part of Yuelu District. It is bounded on the north and west by the Jin River, south by Yanghu Road.

Wildlife
The park is designated as a wildlife preserve. There are more than 700 plant species cultivated in the park, and some 130 species of bird to be seen in the park.

Transportation
 Take subway Line 3 to get off at Yanghu Wetland station or Yanghu ECO. Town station.

Gallery

References

External links

Parks in Hunan
Wetlands of China
Tourist attractions in Changsha
Yuelu District
2010 establishments in China